William Earl "Mickey" Sutton (born August 28, 1960) is a former professional cornerback in the Canadian Football League (CFL), the United States Football League (USFL), and the National Football League (NFL). After playing college football for Chabot Junior College and Montana, Sutton signed with the CFL's Hamilton Tiger-Cats (1983), and the USFL's Pittsburgh Maulers (1984) and Birmingham Stallions (1985). Sutton played five seasons in the NFL for the Los Angeles Rams (1986–1988, 1990), the Buffalo Bills (1989), and the Green Bay Packers (1989).

He is the father of Will Sutton.

References

External links
Archive at Los Angeles Times

1960 births
Living people
Sportspeople from Greenville, Mississippi
People from Union City, California
Players of American football from California
Sportspeople from Alameda County, California
American football cornerbacks
Montana Grizzlies football players
American players of Canadian football
Canadian football defensive backs
Hamilton Tiger-Cats players
Pittsburgh Maulers players
Birmingham Stallions players
Los Angeles Rams players
Buffalo Bills players
Green Bay Packers players